Global Infrastructure Partners (GIP) is an infrastructure investment fund making equity and selected debt investments. GIP's main headquarters are located in New York City and its equity investments are based on infrastructure assets in the energy, transport and water & waste sectors. GIP employs approximately 150 investment and operational professionals and has offices in New York, London and Sydney, with operational headquarters in Stamford, Connecticut. In total as of 2018, its portfolio companies employ approximately 21,000 people.

History
Global Infrastructure Partners was established in May 2006. Two founding investors in its first fund, GIP I, were Credit Suisse and General Electric.  Both committed approximately 9% of the US$5.64 billion of GIP I's committed capital.

The firm's first investment was announced in October 2006. It was a 50:50 joint venture between GIP and American International Group (AIG) to acquire London City Airport for an undisclosed sum.  GIP announced the sale of the asset in February 2016 for a significant multiple of its acquisition price.

GIP has made two additional notable airport investments: the October 2009 acquisition of Gatwick Airport, the second largest airport in the United Kingdom by passenger traffic, for £1.5 billion from BAA and the 2012 acquisition of Edinburgh Airport for £807 million.

GIP has made a cross section of investments in other areas of the transport sector as well as the natural resource and power generation areas of the energy sector. These assets include seaports, freight rail facilities, midstream natural resources and power generation businesses.
 
Global Infrastructure Partners' first fund, GIP I, completed its fund raising in May 2008 with $5.64 billion in investor capital commitments.  The fund became fully invested during 2012. 

In September 2012, GIP's second fund, GIP II, completed fund raising with US$8.25 billion in investor capital commitments, making it the largest independent infrastructure fund in the world at that time. Exceeding what it had initially projected, GIP's third fund—GIP III—completed fund raising in January 2017 with approximately $15.8 billion in investor capital commitments. GIP's fourth equity Fund, GIP IV, completed fund raising in December 2019, raising $22 billion.

GIP also manages several other Funds which focus on investments in infrastructure in other asset classes or target specific regions.  GIP's Credit business manages over $4 billion across three Funds: GIP Capital Solutions I and GIP Capital Solutions II and GIP Spectrum.

Current investments
As of December 2020, Global Infrastructure Partners had aggregate assets under management of approximately US$75 billion, such investments being concentrated in OECD countries. Its portfolio specifically included investment in the following assets:

ADNOC Gas Pipelines
Atlas Renewable Energy
Borkum Riffgrund 2
ChannelView Cogeneration 
Clearway Energy
Competitive Power Ventures
Edinburgh Airport
EnLink Midstream
East India Petroleum Ltd.
Empresa Eléctrica Guacolda S.A.
Eolian Energy
Freeport LNG
Naturgy (fka Gas Natural SGD, S.A.)
Gatwick Airport
Gode Wind 1
Guacolda Energia
Hess Infrastructure Partners
Hornsea 1
London City Airport
Medallion Gathering & Processing
Nuovo Trasporto Viaggiatori
Pacific National
Port of Melbourne
Port of Brisbane Corporation 
Saeta Yield/Bow Power
Signature Aviation
Terra-Gen Power 
TransitGas AG
Terminal Investment Limited
Vena Energy

References

External links
 Global Infrastructure Partners

Private equity firms
Credit Suisse
Joint ventures
General Electric
Financial services companies established in 2006